In mathematics and computer programming, exponentiating by squaring is a general method for fast computation of large positive integer powers of a number, or more generally of an element of a semigroup, like a polynomial or a square matrix. Some variants are commonly referred to as square-and-multiply algorithms or binary exponentiation. These can be of quite general use, for example in modular arithmetic or powering of matrices. For semigroups for which additive notation is commonly used, like elliptic curves used in cryptography, this method is also referred to as double-and-add.

Basic method

Recursive version
The method is based on the observation that, for any integer , one has:

If the exponent is zero then the answer is 1 and if the exponent is negative then we can reuse the previous formula by rewriting the value using a positive exponent. That is,

Together, these may be implemented directly as the following recursive algorithm:

  In: an integer x; an integer n
  Out: xn
  
  exp_by_squaring(x, n)
    if n < 0 then
       return exp_by_squaring(1 / x, -n);
    else if n = 0 then 
       return 1;
    else if n is even then 
       return exp_by_squaring(x * x, n / 2);
    else if n is odd then 
       return x * exp_by_squaring(x * x, (n - 1) / 2);
  end function 

This logarithmic number of operations is to be compared with the trivial algorithm which requires  multiplications.

This algorithm is not tail-recursive. This implies that it requires an auxiliary memory that is roughly proportional (or higher, if one takes the increasing size of datas into account) to the number of recursive calls.

The algorithms of the next section use a different approach, and the resulting algorithms needs the same number of operations, but use an auxiliary memory that is roughly the same as the memory required to store the result.

With constant auxiliary memory

The variants described in this section are based on the formula

This may be implemented as a tail-recursive function:
  Function exp_by_squaring(x, n)
    return exp_by_squaring2(1, x, n)
  Function exp_by_squaring2(y, x, n)
    if n < 0 then return exp_by_squaring2(y, 1 / x, - n);
    else if n = 0 then return y;
    else if n is even then return exp_by_squaring2(y, x * x, n / 2);
    else if n is odd then return exp_by_squaring2(x * y, x * x, (n - 1) / 2).

The iterative version of the algorithm also uses a bounded auxiliary space, and is given by

  Function exp_by_squaring_iterative(x, n)
    if n < 0 then
      x := 1 / x;
      n := -n;
    if n = 0 then return 1
    y := 1;
    while n > 1 do
      if n is even then
        x := x * x;
        n := n / 2;
      else
        y := x * y;
        x := x * x;
        n := (n – 1) / 2;
    return x * y

These algorithms use exactly the same number of operations as the algorithm of the preceding section, but the multiplications are done in a different order.

Computational complexity

A brief analysis shows that such an algorithm uses  squarings and at most  multiplications, where  denotes the floor function. More precisely, the number of multiplications is one less than the number of ones present in the binary expansion of n. For n greater than about 4 this is computationally more efficient than naively multiplying the base with itself repeatedly.

Each squaring results in approximately double the number of digits of the previous, and so, if multiplication of two d-digit numbers is implemented in O(dk) operations for some fixed k, then the complexity of computing xn is given by

2k-ary method
This algorithm calculates the value of xn after expanding the exponent in base 2k. It was first proposed by Brauer in 1939. In the algorithm below we make use of the following function f(0) = (k, 0) and f(m) = (s, u), where m = u·2s with u odd.

Algorithm:

Input An element x of G, a parameter k > 0, a non-negative integer  and the precomputed values .

Output The element xn in G

 y := 1; i := l - 1
 while i ≥ 0 do
     (s, u) := f(ni)
     for j := 1 to k - s do
         y := y2
     y := y * xu
     for j := 1 to s do
         y := y2
     i := i - 1
 return y

For optimal efficiency, k should be the smallest integer satisfying

Sliding-window method
This method is an efficient variant of the 2k-ary method. For example, to calculate the exponent 398, which has binary expansion (110 001 110)2, we take a window of length 3 using the 2k-ary method algorithm and calculate 1, x3, x6, x12, x24, x48, x49, x98, x99, x198, x199, x398.
But, we can also compute 1, x3, x6, x12, x24, x48, x96, x192, x199, x398, which saves one multiplication and amounts to evaluating (110 001 110)2

Here is the general algorithm:

Algorithm:

Input An element x of G, a non negative integer , a parameter k > 0 and the pre-computed values .

Output The element xn ∈ G.

Algorithm:

 y := 1; i := l - 1
 while i > -1 do
     if ni = 0 then
         y := y2' i := i - 1
     else
         s := max{i - k + 1, 0}
         while ns = 0 do
             s := s + 1
         for h := 1 to i - s + 1 do
             y := y2
         u := (ni, ni-1, ..., ns)2
         y := y * xu
         i := s - 1
 return y

Montgomery's ladder technique
Many algorithms for exponentiation do not provide defence against side-channel attacks. Namely, an attacker observing the sequence of squarings and multiplications can (partially) recover the exponent involved in the computation. This is a problem if the exponent should remain secret, as with many public-key cryptosystems. A technique called "Montgomery's ladder" addresses this concern.

Given the binary expansion of a positive, non-zero integer n = (nk−1...n0)2 with nk−1 = 1, we can compute xn as follows:
 x1 = x; x2 = x2
 for i = k - 2 to 0 do
     if ni = 0 then
         x2 = x1 * x2; x1 = x12
     else
         x1 = x1 * x2; x2 = x22
 return x1

The algorithm performs a fixed sequence of operations (up to log n): a multiplication and squaring takes place for each bit in the exponent, regardless of the bit's specific value. A similar algorithm for multiplication by doubling exists.

This specific implementation of Montgomery's ladder is not yet protected against cache timing attacks: memory access latencies might still be observable to an attacker, as different variables are accessed depending on the value of bits of the secret exponent. Modern cryptographic implementations use a "scatter" technique to make sure the processor always misses the faster cache.

Fixed-base exponent
There are several methods which can be employed to calculate xn when the base is fixed and the exponent varies. As one can see, precomputations play a key role in these algorithms.

Yao's method
Yao's method is orthogonal to the -ary method where the exponent is expanded in radix  and the computation is as performed in the algorithm above.

Let the exponent  be written as
 
where  for all .

Let .

Then the algorithm uses the equality
 

 y = 1, u = 1, j = h - 1
 while j > 0 do
     for i = 0 to w - 1 do
         if ni = j then
             u = u × xbi
     y = y × u
     j = j - 1
 return y

The variable y is multiplied  times with the initial ,  times with the next highest powers, and so on.
The algorithm uses  multiplications, and  elements must be stored to compute .

Euclidean method
The Euclidean method was first introduced in Efficient exponentiation using precomputation and vector addition chains by P.D Rooij.

This method for computing  in group , where  is a natural integer, whose algorithm is given below, is using the following equality recursively:
 
where .

Given the base element  in group , and the exponent  written as in Yao's method, the element  is calculated using  precomputed values  and then the algorithm below.

 Begin loop
      
      
     Break loop 
      
      
 End loop;
 

Further applications
The same idea allows fast computation of large exponents modulo a number. Especially in cryptography, it is useful to compute powers in a ring of integers modulo q. It can also be used to compute integer powers in a group, using the rule

Power(x, −n) = (Power(x, n))−1.

The method works in every semigroup and is often used to compute powers of matrices.

For example, the evaluation of

13789722341 (mod 2345) = 2029

would take a very long time and much storage space if the naïve method were used: compute 13789722341, then take the remainder when divided by 2345. Even using a more effective method will take a long time: square 13789, take the remainder when divided by 2345, multiply the result by 13789, and so on. This will take less than  modular multiplications.

Applying above exp-by-squaring algorithm, with "*" interpreted as x * y = xy mod 2345 (that is, a multiplication followed by a division with remainder) leads to only 27 multiplications and divisions of integers, which may all be stored in a single machine word.

Signed-digit recoding
For example, when computing , the binary method requires  multiplications and  squarings.

To this end we define the signed-digit representation of an integer  in radix  as
 

There are several methods for computing this representation. The representation is not unique. This representation always has minimal Hamming weight.

 
   
   
 

Another algorithm by Koyama and Tsuruoka does not require the condition that ; it still minimizes the Hamming weight.

Alternatives and generalizations

Exponentiation by squaring can be viewed as a suboptimal addition-chain exponentiation algorithm: it computes the exponent by an addition chain consisting of repeated exponent doublings (squarings) and/or incrementing exponents by one (multiplying by x) only. More generally, if one allows any previously computed exponents to be summed (by multiplying those powers of x), one can sometimes perform the exponentiation using fewer multiplications (but typically using more memory). The smallest power where this occurs is for n = 15:

  (squaring, 6 multiplies),
  (optimal addition chain, 5 multiplies if x3 is re-used).

In general, finding the optimal addition chain for a given exponent is a hard problem, for which no efficient algorithms are known, so optimal chains are typically only used for small exponents (e.g. in compilers where the chains for small powers have been pre-tabulated). However, there are a number of heuristic algorithms that, while not being optimal, have fewer multiplications than exponentiation by squaring at the cost of additional bookkeeping work and memory usage. Regardless, the number of multiplications never grows more slowly than Θ(log n), so these algorithms only improve asymptotically upon exponentiation by squaring by a constant factor at best.

See also
Modular exponentiation
Vectorial addition chain
Montgomery reduction
Non-adjacent form
Addition chain

Notes

References

Exponentials
Computer arithmetic algorithms
Computer arithmetic